Mung bean starch jelly may refer to:

 Liangfen, mung bean starch jelly in China
 Nokdu-muk, mung bean starch jelly in Korea
 Laping, mung bean starch jelly in Tibet

See also
 Mung bean